Lucky is the fifth book in The It Girl series, released in 2007. It was written by a ghostwriter with suggestions from Cecily von Ziegesar. Aimed toward young adults, it is a spin-off from the bestselling Gossip Girl series.

Plot summary
Jenny Humphrey has attended some crazy parties at Waverly Academy, but none as hot as the bash at Miller farm, where the antique red barn went up in flames. Literally. So, when Dean Marymount announces that someone will be held responsible and expelled from Waverly, it's every owl for him and herself.

Tensions are rising, rumors are flying, and pretty soon, everyone is a suspect. Jenny worries about her adorable, shaggy-haired new crush, Julian, whose silver engraved Zippo was found at the crime scene. Callie is petrified she and Easy will both get kicked out because they were in the barn together when the blaze began. And Tinsley knows she'll take the heat for organizing the wild soirée in the first place. Luckily she's come up with a crafty way to keep from getting in trouble: blaming Jenny. But, unfortunately, Julian and Jenny get "closer than ever." When "things can't get any better," Jenny finds out the only reason Julian even met her is that he was hooking up with Tinsley Carmichael, which causes Jenny not to trust him.

Easy becomes very suspicious of Callie because of her comments about Jenny starting the fire. Kara and Brett's relationship goes public, and Brett figures out she still loves Jeremiah, and Kara and Heath hook up and become a couple. Shockingly, Tinsley's plan works, but it also backfires. Easy finds out that Callie had something to do with the intent to kick Jenny out and tries to rescue Jenny. Unfortunately, Callie and Easy's relationship is over—Easy was put off by Callie's plot to get Jenny out, which he discovered when Tinsley texted Callie-and Jenny still hasn't forgiven Julian for lying to her. Easy supposedly pays off Old Lady Miller, whose barn burned down, and Jenny is rescued and returned to Waverly. Old Lady Miller said that her cows caused it and not Jenny. Jenny admits to setting the barn on fire (and gets expelled) just because she can't take everyone's accusations, dirty looks, and rumors. However, Jenny is admitted back into Waverly.

References

2007 American novels
American young adult novels
Chick lit novels
Novels by Cecily von Ziegesar